Thylactus chinensis is a species of beetle in the family Cerambycidae. It was described by Kriesche in 1924. It is known from Vietnam, China and Taiwan.

References

Xylorhizini
Beetles described in 1924